Pimpalation is the second solo studio album by American rapper Pimp C from UGK. It was released on July 11, 2006 through Rap-A-Lot Records, Asylum Records and Atlantic Records, making it the rapper's last solo album released during his lifetime. Recording sessions took place at Dean's List House of Hits, at M.A.D. Studios and Studio 7303 in Houston and at PatchWerk Recording Studios in Atlanta. Production was handled by several record producers, including Mr. Lee, Mike Dean, Jazze Pha and Mannie Fresh. A chopped and screwed version of the album was mixed by DJ Michael "5000" Watts. The album features a large number of guest performers, such as 8Ball & MJG, ABN, Ali & Gipp, Big Mike, Bun B, Chamillionaire, J. Prince, Lil' Boosie, Lil' Keke, Mike Jones, Scarface, Slim Thug, Tela, Webbie and Willie D among others.

The album debuted at number three on the Billboard 200, selling 87,288 copies in its first week of release in the United States, it charted at number one on the Top R&B/Hip-Hop Albums and the Top Rap Albums charts. It was certified Gold in sales by the Recording Industry Association of America on March 8, 2007 for selling over 500,000 copies in the U.S.

The album spawned three singles: "I'm Free", "Pourin' Up" and "Knockin' Doorz Down".

The CD is the follow-up to the Pimpalation: Return of the Trill DVD, which was released on April 11, 2006. The DVD showed Pimp C celebrating his release from prison on December 30, 2005 and in the studio working on music with a host of stars including Scarface, Z-Ro, Webbie, Bun B, Lil' Flip and Young Jeezy. Lil' Flip and Jeezy didn't appear on the album though.

Track listing

Sample credits
Track 2 contains a sample from "Free Fallin'" by Tom Petty
Track 7 contains a portion of "Take It Off" by UGK
Track 10 contains a portion of "Get Ready for the Get Down" by Willie Hutch
Track 13 contains a sample of "Havin Thangs" by Big Mike
Track 15 contains a sample of "Don't Say Shit" by UGK
Track 16 contains a sample of "I Miss You" by Aaron Hall

Charts

Weekly charts

Year-end charts

Certifications

References

External links

2006 albums
Pimp C albums
Rap-A-Lot Records albums
Albums produced by Jazze Pha
Albums produced by Mannie Fresh
Albums produced by Mike Dean (record producer)